In commutative algebra, the Fitting ideals of a finitely generated module over a commutative ring describe the obstructions to generating the module by a given number of elements.

Definition
If M is a finitely generated module over a commutative ring R generated by elements m1,...,mn
with relations

then the ith Fitting ideal Fitti(M) of M is generated by the minors (determinants of submatrices) of order n − i of the matrix ajk. 
The Fitting ideals do not depend on the choice of generators and relations  of M.

Some authors defined the Fitting ideal I(M) to be the first nonzero Fitting ideal Fitti(M).

Properties
The Fitting ideals are increasing

 Fitt0(M) ⊆ Fitt1(M) ⊆ Fitt2(M) ...

If M can be generated by n elements then Fittn(M) = R, and if R is local the converse holds.  We have Fitt0(M) ⊆ Ann(M) (the annihilator of M), and Ann(M)Fitti(M) ⊆ Fitti−1(M), so in particular if M can be generated by n elements then Ann(M)n ⊆ Fitt0(M).

Examples

If M is free of rank n then the Fitting ideals Fitti(M) are zero for i<n and R for i ≥ n. 

If M is a finite abelian group of order |M| (considered as a module over the integers) then the Fitting ideal Fitt0(M) is the ideal (|M|).

The Alexander polynomial of a knot is a generator of the Fitting ideal of the first homology of the infinite abelian cover of the knot complement.

Fitting image 
The zeroth Fitting ideal can be used also to give a definition of scheme-theoretic image of morphisms, which behaves well in families. Given a morphism of schemes , the Fitting image of f is defined to be the closed subscheme associated to the sheaf of ideals , where  is seen as a -module via the canonical morphism .

References

Commutative algebra